Sean Patrick Nolin (born December 26, 1989) is an American professional baseball pitcher in the Minnesota Twins organization. He has previously played in Major League Baseball (MLB) for the Toronto Blue Jays, Oakland Athletics, and Washington Nationals, and for the Saitama Seibu Lions of Nippon Professional Baseball (NPB).

Professional career

Toronto Blue Jays
Nolin was drafted by the Toronto Blue Jays in the sixth round of the 2010 MLB Entry Draft out of San Jacinto Junior College. He had originally been selected by the Milwaukee Brewers in the fiftieth round of the 2008 Major League Baseball Draft, and by the Seattle Mariners in the forty-eighth round of the 2009 Major League Baseball Draft, but did not sign either time.

Nolin debuted with the Auburn Doubledays of the New York–Penn League in 2010, starting six games while recording a 6.05 ERA. In 2011, he had a 4-4 record and 3.49 ERA with the Lansing Lugnuts. Nolin split the 2012 season between the Dunedin Blue Jays and the New Hampshire Fisher Cats, finishing at 10-0 with a 2.04 ERA. Nolin missed the first month of the 2013 baseball season with a groin injury suffered during spring training. On May 23, 2013, it was announced that Nolin would be called up to the Major Leagues to start on May 24, 2013 against the Baltimore Orioles. He was formally called up on May 24 when J. A. Happ was transferred to the 60-day disabled list. Nolin took the loss in his debut, pitching 1 innings and giving up six earned runs and one walk. He was optioned back to Double-A New Hampshire following the 10–6 loss. Nolin was ranked as the number 5 prospect in the Blue Jays organization on July 26, 2013, when the revised Top 100 Prospects list was released. Nolin was promoted to the Triple-A Buffalo Bisons on August 17. Nolin was invited to spring training in 2014 and optioned to the Buffalo Bisons on March 16, 2014. He posted a 4–7 record in the minors in 2014, with an ERA of 3.43 and 88 strikeouts over 97 innings pitched.

Nolin was called up to the Blue Jays on September 1, as part of the September roster expansion. He would make just one appearance for Toronto in 2014, pitching a single inning of relief on September 22.

Oakland Athletics
On November 28, 2014, Nolin was traded to the Oakland Athletics, along with Brett Lawrie, Kendall Graveman, and Franklin Barreto, for Josh Donaldson. He was recalled from the Triple-A Nashville Sounds on September 4, 2015. On September 6, he made his Athletics debut in a 3-2 loss against the Seattle Mariners. Nolin earned his first MLB win on September 12, as the Athletics defeated the Texas Rangers 5–3.

On February 12, 2016, the A's designated Nolin for assignment.

Milwaukee Brewers
On February 22, 2016, Nolin was claimed off waivers by the Milwaukee Brewers. On August 21, 2016, Nolin underwent Tommy John surgery, and was put on the injured list for the rest of the 2016 season plus all of 2017. He re-signed a minor league deal for the 2017 season. Nolin elected free agency on November 6, 2017.

Colorado Rockies
On February 18, 2018, Nolin signed a minor league deal with the Colorado Rockies. He became a free agent after the season ended.

Chicago White Sox
On February 28, 2019, Nolin signed a minor league deal with the Chicago White Sox. He was released on April 25, 2019.

Long Island Ducks
On May 3, 2019, Nolin signed with the Long Island Ducks of the Atlantic League of Professional Baseball.

Seattle Mariners
On June 7, Nolin's contract was purchased by the Seattle Mariners and he was assigned to the Triple-A Tacoma Rainiers. He became a free agent following the 2019 season.

Saitama Seibu Lions
On December 6, 2019, Nolin signed with the Saitama Seibu Lions of Nippon Professional Baseball (NPB).

On August 29, 2020, Nolin made his NPB debut, and he earned his first NPB win. On December 2, 2020, he became a free agent.

Washington Nationals
On March 9, 2021, Nolin signed a minor league contract with the Washington Nationals organization. The Nationals selected Nolin's contract from the Triple-A Rochester Red Wings on August 11, 2021, calling him up to the major leagues. On August 11, 2021, the Nationals selected Nolin's contract, marking his first appearance in MLB in 6 years. On September 9, Nolin intentionally threw at Atlanta Braves' first baseman Freddie Freeman, and was issued a 5-game suspension, in which he did not appeal. Nolin made 10 appearances for the Nationals, going 0-2 with a 4.39 ERA and 20 strikeouts. On October 13, the Nationals sent Nolin outright to Triple-A Rochester. Nolin elected free agency but signed a new minor league deal with the Nationals for 2022 on November 2, 2021. However, Nolin was later released to sign overseas.

Kia Tigers
On January 8, 2022, Nolin signed with the Kia Tigers of the KBO League. Nolin made 21 starts for Kia, posting an 8-8 record and 2.47 ERA with 108 strikeouts in 124.0 innings pitched. He became a free agent after the 2022 season.

Minnesota Twins
On February 10, 2023, Nolin signed a minor league contract with the Minnesota Twins organization.

Pitching style
Nolin's fastball runs in the high-80s to low-90s in MPH and he also throws a curveball (72-75 MPH), changeup (low-80s in MPH), and slider.

References

External links

1989 births
Living people
American expatriate baseball players in Canada
American expatriate baseball players in Japan
Auburn Doubledays players
Baseball players from New York (state)
Birmingham Barons players
Buffalo Bisons (minor league) players
Dunedin Blue Jays players
Gulf Coast Blue Jays players
Hartford Yard Goats players
Lansing Lugnuts players
Leones del Escogido players
American expatriate baseball players in the Dominican Republic
Long Island Ducks players
Major League Baseball pitchers
Mesa Solar Sox players
Nashville Sounds players
New Hampshire Fisher Cats players
Nippon Professional Baseball pitchers
Oakland Athletics players
People from Seaford, New York
Rochester Red Wings players
Saitama Seibu Lions players
San Jacinto North Gators baseball players
Tacoma Rainiers players
Toronto Blue Jays players
Washington Nationals players
Yaquis de Obregón players
American expatriate baseball players in Mexico